Pottersville is an unincorporated community in Franklin Township, Owen County, in the U.S. state of Indiana.

History
Pottersville was laid out in 1858.

Geography

References

Unincorporated communities in Indiana
Unincorporated communities in Owen County, Indiana